The Norwich Post was an English provincial newspaper which existed between 1701 and 1713. It is believed to be the earliest truly provincial English newspaper, although the London Gazette was briefly published in Oxford in 1665.

History
The printer Francis Burges set up a printing press at the Red Well in Norwich, England during the summer of 1701.  He appears to have established a weekly newspaper from early November of that year (although the earliest surviving copy dates from 1707). 

Burges died in November 1706 and was succeeded by his widow Elizabeth, who continued the business despite competition from the newly established newspapers the Norwich Postman (December 1706) and the Norwich Gazette (January 1707). After Elizabeth Burges' death in November 1709, the newspaper reverted to Francis Burges' former master, the printer Freeman Collins of London. Collins sent his most trusted apprentices or members of his family to Norwich to print the newspaper. These included Edward Cave, later the founder of the Gentleman's Magazine.

The newspaper continued until Collin's death in 1713, and thereafter it was superseded by the Norwich Courant.

Sources

Defunct newspapers published in the United Kingdom
Publications established in 1701
1701 establishments in England
Newspapers published in Norfolk
1713 disestablishments in England
Publications disestablished in 1713